ISIRTA, D-I

The radio comedy program features plays with titles that start with "D," "E," "F," "G," "H," and "I." "I'm Sorry, I'll Read That Again"

D plays

Dentisti (Animal dentist in Africa)

Cast
 Narrator – David Hatch
 Dentisti – John Cleese
 Maisie – Jo Kendall
 Game Warden – Tim Brooke-Taylor
 Gumboyle – Bill Oddie
 Twinkle – Graeme Garden
 Spud – David Hatch
 Lady Constance de Coverlet – Tim Brooke-Taylor
 Grimbling the Puma – Bill Oddie
 Queen Victoria the Chimp – Graeme Garden
 Rogue Mouse – John Cleese
 Wild Berries – Tim Brooke-Taylor, John Cleese, Graeme Garden, Bill Oddie

Structure of the episode
 Cold Open: Story Time: Mr. & Mrs. Bunny Rabbit – Jo Kendall, Tim Brooke-Taylor, and Graeme Garden
 Skit: Antique Quiz – John Cleese, Jo Kendall, Tim Brooke-Taylor, Graeme Garden, and Bill Oddie
 Skit: Blackmail? Fishpaste? – Graeme Garden, John Cleese, and Jo Kendall
 Skit: Fire and Brimstone Weather Report – John Cleese and David Hatch
 Song: "Taking My Oyster for Walkies" – Bill Oddie and the Cast
 Play: "Dentisti" – The Cast

Dick Whittington and His Wonderful Hat

Cast
 Narrator – David Hatch
 Dick Whittington – Jo Kendall
 Nutty Slack – John Cleese
 Baron Landscape, Lord Mayor of London – Graeme Garden
 Fairy Grandmother (Lady Constance de Coverlet) – Tim Brooke-Taylor
 Ugly Sisters – Graeme Garden and Bill Oddie
 Puss, Dick Whittington's Cat – Bill Oddie
 Page Boy – Tim Brooke-Taylor
 Football Referee – John Cleese
 Grimbling, Butler to the Lord Mayor – Bill Oddie
 Bells – Tim Brooke-Taylor
 Footman – John Cleese
 Villagers – Tim Brooke-Taylor, John Cleese, Graeme Garden, Bill Oddie
 Mice – Tim Brooke-Taylor, John Cleese, Graeme Garden, Bill Oddie
 Flippity-Floppity Bunny – John Cleese
 Child from the Audience – Tim Brooke-Taylor

Structure of the episode

Doctor Clubfoot of the Antarctic

Cast

Structure of the episode

Doctor Why and the Thing

Cast
Main characters are listed in bold letters

 The man of many names — Bill Oddie
 Peter Pott — Tim Brooke-Taylor
 Quasimodo — Bill Oddie
 Doctor Why (Smith?) (a Scientist) — Graeme Garden
 Prudence (the Doctor's granddaughter) — Jo Kendall
 Colonel Katamoll — David Hatch
 Mirabelle Coarsefathing — Jo Kendall
 Chief of Staff — Bill Oddie
 Army Sergeant — Graeme Garden

Structure of the episode
Cold Open: Long Range Weather Forecast
Sketch: Nature Study
Song: Let There Be Love – Bill Oddie
Sketch: Prehistoric Woo-man – Graeme Garden and Bill Oddie
Song: HMS Dreadful – Bill Oddie, David Hatch, Graeme Garden and Tim Brooke-Taylor
Play: Doctor Why and the Thing – The Cast
Song: So Say All Of Us – The Cast

Dr. Heckle and Mr. Jibe

Cast
 Dr. Heckle/Mr. Jibe – David Hatch
 Mr. Blackwood (Narrator) – Graeme Garden
 Timothy Brown-Windsor – Tim Brooke-Taylor
 Mrs. Heckle – Jo Kendall
 Grimbling – Bill Oddie
 Constable – John Cleese
 Gas Meter Reader – Bill Oddie
 Announcer Providing Explanation – John Cleese

Structure of the episode
 Cold Open: Big B News – Bill Oddie, Tim Brooke-Taylor, and Graeme Garden
 Sketch: Radio Listeners – Jo Kendall and Bill Oddie, with Tim Brooke-Taylor, John Cleese, Graeme Garden, and David Hatch
 Sketch: The Czar and Czarina of Backward Islands Visit – David Hatch, John Cleese, Graeme Garden, Jo Kendall, and Tim Brooke-Taylor
 Song: "The Eve of Election" – Bill Oddie and Jo Kendall
 Sketch: Ping-Pong – Tim Brooke-Taylor
 Sketch: Frozen to the Wheel – John Cleese and Tim Brooke-Taylor
 Song: "The Rhubarb Tart Song" – John Cleese and the Cast
 Play: Dr. Heckle and Mr. Jibe – The Cast

Dr. Zhivago and His Wonderful Lamp (Aladdin)

Cast
 Narrator – David Hatch
 Dr. Zhivago – Tim Brooke-Taylor
 BBC Executive – John Cleese
 The Magic Tramp – Bill Oddie
 The Genie – Jo Kendall
 Dr. Zhivago's Ugly Sisters – Bill Oddie and Graeme Garden
 The Fairy Godmother – Jo Kendall
 Tsar Nicholas II – John Cleese
 Tsarina Alexandra – Jo Kendall
 Kossoff, Teller of Tales – Graeme Garden
 Chamberlain – Tim Brooke-Taylor
 Tiddler on the Poof – Graeme Garden
 Buttons, the Tsar's Advisor – Bill Oddie
 Messenger – Graeme Garden
 Guard – Bill Oddie
 Dr. Cameron – Graeme Garden
 Nicholas Parsons – Graeme Garden
 Justin – Tim Brooke-Taylor
 Amanda – Jo Kendall
 Vladimir Lenin – Bill Oddie
 Church Bells – Tim Brooke-Taylor

Structure of the episode

 Cold Open: A Warning to Shipping 
 Sketch: TV v. Radio 
 Radio Prune Takes Over, including Full Frontal Radio
 Sketch: Miss World Contest – Les Girls 
 Sketch: Censored Christmas Songs 
 Sketch: Retrospect of 1970
 Pantomime: Aladdin/Dr. Zhivago and His Wonderful Lamp/Tramp

E plays

England in Medieval Times

Cast

Structure of the episode
(opening music)
 Skit: Arabian Desert (exotic dancers and oil drilling)
 Skit: Doctor with fat patient
 Song: "Chartered Accountant"
 Play: "England in Medieval Times" (Ancient legends; Lady Godiva)

England Our England

Cast

Structure of the episode
 Skit: The next programme follows in half an hour
 Skit: Proxl lesson
 Skit: Insurance: Herd of bison in Whitehall
 Song: "Protect My Honey on her Journey: Send Her by Post"
 Play: Learning to Fly (Pterodactyls: Cosmo and Thingy)
 Busker song: "Waiting for the London Bus" (spiritual)
 Play: "England Our England" (documentary / travelogue)

F plays

A Fairy Tale

Cast

Structure of the episode
 Song: "Aardvark, Ferret, Vulture"
 Skit: Souvenir Horrible Hairy Spiders
 Skit: Burglar(?) (Gas Board, Drain Board)
 Message: Late cricket news (W.G. Grace is dead)
 Play: "A Fairy Tale" (Prince Valiant and Goldilocks / Tom Little-Finger - Frog Prince)

First Pilot

Cast

Structure of the episode

G plays

The Ghost of McMuckle Manse

Cast
 Narrator – David Hatch
 Tim Brown-Windsor – Tim Brooke-Taylor
 Fiona Rabbit-Vacuum – Jo Kendall
 Prof. Throgmorton Wembley – David Hatch
 The Ghost of Lady Constance McMuckle (Lady Constance de Coverlet) – Tim Brooke-Taylor
 The Ghost of McMuckle Manse (Arnold Totteridge) – Graeme Garden
 1st Servant – Bill Oddie
 2nd Servant – Graeme Garden
 Fatu – Jo Kendall
 Clutch Featheringhall – David Hatch
 Gentleman – Graeme Garden
 Grimbling – Bill Oddie
 Odd Noise Outside – Jo Kendall
 Guttering Candle – Graeme Garden
 Mysterious Voice – somebody else

Structure of the episode
 Skit: Bits and Pieces – David Hatch
 Skit: Great Men Of Our Time: Sir Ruddy Shame – The Cast
 Skit: The Facts of Cash – Jo Kendall 
 Skit: Champion Boxer Interview – David Hatch and Tim Brooke-Taylor
 Song: I Wish You Love – Bill Oddie, Graeme Garden, Tim Brooke-Taylor
 Play: The Ghost of McMuckle Manse – The Cast

The Ghost of Objectionable Manor

Cast

Structure of the episode

Goldilocks (and Prince Valiant)

Cast

Structure of the episode

Greek Tragedy

Cast
Narrator – David Hatch
Oedipus – Graeme Garden
Oedipus's Mother (Lady Constance de Coverlet) – Tim Brooke-Taylor
Helen of Troy – Jo Kendall
Oracle – Bill Oddie
Zeus – John Cleese
Cassandra – Tim-Brooke-Taylor
Chorus – Tim Brooke-Taylor, John Cleese, Graeme Garden, Jo Kendall, Bill Oddie
Commentators – John Cleese, Tim Brooke-Taylor, Graeme Garden, Bill Oddie
Eddie Waring – Graeme Garden
Herald – John Cleese
Starter – Bill Oddie
Sun – John Cleese
Shaft of Sunlight – Graeme Garden
Gentle Breeze – John Cleese
Eyes Popping Out – Bill Oddie

Structure of the episode
Cold Open: Combined Holiday – The Cast
Skit: Holiday Programming on Television – Jo Kendall
Skit: Chrismeaster Whit Year's Eve Bank Holiday Night With The Stars – David Hatch, Bill Oddie, and Graeme Garden
Skit: The Holidays are a Time For... – John Cleese
Skit: Holiday News Read By The Cheeky Chappies – Tim Brooke-Taylor and Bill Oddie
Skit: Hogmanay – Graeme Garden, Bill Oddie, and Jo Kendall
Skit: Traffic News – Tim Brooke-Taylor, Jo Kendall, and Bill Oddie
Skit: Brian Rix Farce: "Watch It Vicar, She's Dropped 'Em Again But Don't Tell Hitler" – John Cleese, Jo Kendall, Tim Brooke-Taylor, Graeme Garden, and Bill Oddie
Song: The Tillingbourne Folk & Madrigal Society Sing Football Chants – The Cast
Prune Play: Oedipus Rex And His Red Hot Mama – The Cast

H plays

The Harder They Fall, the More They Hurt Themselves

Cast
 Narrator ― David Hatch
 Butch/Sugar Puff Robinson ― John Cleese
 Solly Goldblatt Yarmulke Bagel Bagel Gefilte Fish Already, OBE ― Graeme Garden
 Ophelia Gently ― Jo Kendall
 Jack ― Bill Oddie
 Computer PXO2115, OBE (Lady Constance de Coverlet) ― Tim Brooke-Taylor
 Commentator ― Bill Oddie
 Ring Announcer ― Tim Brooke-Taylor
 Referee ― Graeme Garden
 Cooper ― Bill Oddie
 Boxers at Jack's Gym ― Tim Brooke-Taylor, John Cleese, Graeme Garden
 The Next Man ― Tim Brooke-Taylor
 Spot ― Bill Oddie
 Bell ― Graeme Garden

Structure of the show
 Cold Open: The Black/Yellow/Pink-and-White Minstrel Show ― Tim Brooke-Taylor, John Cleese, Graeme Garden, Bill Oddie, and David Hatch
 Skit: The Radio Prune Awards ― The Cast
 Song: "Bradford Girls" ― Bill Oddie and the Cast
 Prune Play: The Harder They Fall, The More They Hurt Themselves ― The Cast

Henry VIII

Cast
 Narrators ― David Hatch, Bill Oddie, and Graeme Garden
 Henry VIII ― Graeme Garden
 Catherine of Aragon ― Jo Kendall
 Anne of Cleavage (Cleves) (Lady Constance de Coverlet) ― Tim Brooke-Taylor
 Cardinal Sin ― David Hatch
 Anne Boleyn ― Jo Kendall
 Jane Seymour ― Bill Oddie
 Catherine Howard ― Bill Oddie
 Herald ― Tim Brooke-Taylor
 Executioner ― Tim Brooke-Taylor
 Priest ― Bill Oddie
 Schoolboy ― Tim Brooke-Taylor

Structure of the episode

 Cold Open: Listeners’ Strike ― Graeme Garden and the Cast
 Skit: Radio Prune: Cooking Hint ― David Hatch and Graeme Garden
 Skit: Recipe Time ― Jo Kendall
 Skit: Full Frontal Newsroom/Army Take Over Newsroom – David Hatch and Bill Oddie
 Skit: Violence Today ― Tim Brooke-Taylor, Graeme Garden, and Bill Oddie
 Song: The MCC Song ― Bill Oddie, Tim Brooke-Taylor, Graeme Garden, and David Hatch
 Prune Play: The Six Wives of Henry VIII ― The Cast

History of Radio

Cast

Structure of the episode

History of the British Army

Cast

Structure of the episode

History of the Cinema

Cast

Structure of the episode

I plays

Incompetence

Cast
(cast, in order of appearance)

The characters are listed in bold letters

 Joshua Arkwright — Graeme Garden
 Bearer of News — Tim Brooke-Taylor 
 Jed Thorough-Budget  (Chief Rioter) — Tim Brooke-Taylor 
 Rioter — Bill Oddie
 Poet — John Cleese
 Enoch Arkwright — David Hatch
 Martha Scrubber-Thatchet — Jo Kendall
 Messenger — Graeme Garden
 Jonathan Arkwright — Bill Oddie
 Lady Constance de Coverlet — Tim Brooke-Taylor 
 Lawyer — Graeme Garden

Structure of the episode

The Inimitable Grimbling

Cast
 Bertie Brown-Winsor- Tim Brooke-Taylor
 Grimbling- Bill Oddie
 Footles Stig Baskerville-Hatch'' - David Hatch
 Lady Constance de Coverlet- Tim Brooke-Taylor
 Godfrey de Coverlet- Graeme Garden
 Duchess of Prune- Jo Kendall
 Sir Quentin Mousewarmingthing- Graeme Garden
 Gladys Gotobed- Jo Kendall
 Gardener- Bill Oddie
 James, the Butler- David Hatch

Structure of the episode

Memory Lane / Theme Tune/ Zoo Time / Why Doesn't An Elephant Go Tweet Tweet? / House on Fire / All things Bright and Beautiful (Carnivore Song) / The Inimitable Grimbling

Interlude

Cast

Structure of the episode

Inventors

Cast

Structure of the episode

External links

ISIRTA plays